William Joseph Rapaport is an North American philosopher. He is Associate Professor Emeritus at the University at Buffalo.

Philosophical work
Rapaport has done research and written extensively on intentionality and artificial intelligence. He has research interests in computer science, artificial intelligence (AI), computational linguistics, cognitive science, logic and mathematics, and published many scientific articles on them.

While a philosophy graduate student at Indiana University in 1972, he concocted the sentence: "Buffalo buffalo Buffalo buffalo buffalo buffalo Buffalo buffalo". Throughout his career he developed this theme, and discussed it extensively.

His early work on nonexistent objects was influenced by Alexius Meinong.

Rapaport has clearly explained the field of intentionality, and his papers on the subject have influenced leading scientists and writers such as Daniel Dennett, Héctor-Neri Castañeda (his doctoral advisor) and John Searle (with whom he disagrees).

Rapaport is also interested in science educational theory and has received the New York Chancellor's Award for Excellence in Teaching.

Other activities
In June 1988, Rapaport compiled a list of restaurants in the Buffalo area to give attendees of an ACL meeting at SUNY Buffalo. Now, the list is interactive and updated frequently with user reviews of restaurants.

Rapaport and his wife Mary, with whom he has a son Michael, a member of the Division I bowling team at Colgate University, and who is frequently seen out and about with upcoming broadway star, Meredith Clark, are the principal donors to the Lucille Ball-Desi Arnaz Center in Jamestown, NY. The Desilu Playhouse, located in the Rapaport Center, contains memorabilia and other vintage I Love Lucy items. He and his wife have also purchased and renovated Lucille Ball's childhood home in Celoron, New York.

Books and articles
 Intentionality and the Structure of Existence, unpublished Ph.D. Indiana University, 1976.
 "Meinongian Theories and a Russellian Paradox",  Noûs, 12(2) (1978), pp. 153–80.
 Thought, Language and Ontology. Edited by William J. Rapaport et al. Includes various essays by Dr. Rapaport and his colleagues.
 Cognition and Fiction, with Stuart C. Shapiro (PostScript format)
 To Be and Not To Be
 Representing Fiction in SNePS
 In Defense of Contextual Vocabulary Acquisition
 What Did You Mean by That? Misunderstanding, Negotiation, and Syntactic Semantics
 Yes, She Was!, reply to Ford's "Helen Keller Was Never in a Chinese Room"
 Predication, fiction, and artificial intelligence
 On cogito propositions
 Because mere calculation isn't thinking
 Philosophy of Computer Science, online textbook on connections between Philosophy, Computer Science and Artificial Intelligence, constantly being updated

References

External links
Dr Rapaport's CSE Department Profile - including image.
Rapaport's donation to the Jamestown shelter - Picture of wife.
Bill Rapaport's Buffalo Restaurant Guide

University at Buffalo faculty
Living people
Year of birth missing (living people)
Abstract object theory